Loch Achilty is a large picturesque lowland freshwater loch set within a sloping birch and oakwood forest, and located near to Contin in Ross-shire, Scottish Highlands, Scotland. Loch Achilty is notable for having no outflow. It has been assumed that it is discharging its surplus water via tunnel into the River Rosay (now known as the Black Water) that eventually flows into the larger River Conon.

Geography
Loch Achilty is a small but deep loch in Torrachilty wood, three miles west of Strathpeffer, and contains char. In outline it is somewhat elliptical, with the long axis trending north-east and south-west. The floor of Loch Achilty is irregular.

References

Achilty
Achilty